Axel Paul Urie (born 14 April 1999) is a professional footballer who plays as a winger for  club Concarneau. Born in France, he represents the Central African Republic national team.

Club career
Urie began his senior career with the reserves of Nîmes and Guingamp. He made his professional debut with Guingamp in a 3–0 Coupe de France loss to FC Lorient on 16 October 2019. On 19 July 2021, he transferred to Creteil in the Championnat National.

International career
Born in France, Urie is of Central African descent. He made his debut with the Central African Republic national team in a 1–1 2022 FIFA World Cup qualification tie with Cape Verde on 1 September 2021.

References

External links
 
 

1999 births
Living people
Footballers from Nîmes
Citizens of the Central African Republic through descent
Central African Republic footballers
Central African Republic international footballers
French footballers
French sportspeople of Central African Republic descent
Association football wingers
US Créteil-Lusitanos players
En Avant Guingamp players
US Concarneau players
Championnat National players
Championnat National 2 players
Championnat National 3 players